Ardaseer was an opium clipper built at Bombay Dockyard in 1836. A fire on 4 April 1851 destroyed her as she was on a voyage from China to Calcutta via Singapore.

Career
Ardaseer carried Malwah and other opium from India to China, and more generally was in the China trade between Calcutta and China.

Ardaseer, Macintyre, master, had been sailing from Bombay to China when she put into Sourabaya on 9 January 1841. She had encountered a gale near the Caramata Passage that had taken away her topmast, foremast, sails, yards, etc. Her hull and cargo were not damaged and after repairs she completed her voyage.

On her second voyage in 1841 Ardaseer was again dismasted. She left Singapore on 2 November. On 16 November she encountered a typhoon and to save her Macintyre had the crew cut away her masts. When the gale subsided he tried to make for Manila under jury-masts, but was unable to do so. Ardaseer returned to Singapore on 9 December.

Ardaseer weathered another typhoon on 15 September 1849, this time without damage.

Loss 
Unable to defeat the fire, her crew and passengers took to the boats and the next day the Bremen ship Liebnitz rescued them. Ardaseer had been carrying specie and this was put on her boats; the crew and passengers lost all their possessions. Leibnitz landed the people it had rescued at Penang on the 12th. Lovett believed the fire was the result of spontaneous combustion as the fire had started aft where the flammable cargo had been stored.

Citations and references
Citations

References
 
 
 

1836 ships
British ships built in India
Age of Sail merchant ships of England
Maritime incidents in April 1851